Micromonospora luteifusca is a bacterium from the genus Micromonospora which has been isolated from the nodules of the plant Pisum sativum in Cañizal, Spain.

References

External links
Type strain of Micromonospora luteifusca at BacDive -  the Bacterial Diversity Metadatabase

 

Micromonosporaceae
Bacteria described in 2017